The Braunlage Nude Sledging World Championship (German: Braunlage Nackt Rodeln Weltmeisterschaft) was held between 2009 and 2012 in February in the city of Braunlage, Germany. The event was discontinued because of too much affluence of onlookers.

References

International sports competitions hosted by Germany